Spring Branch is a city located in Comal County, Texas, United States. It has approximately 250 residents. The community voted to incorporate in an election held on November 3, 2015 and Spring Branch officially became a city on November 19, 2015.

Originally settled by Germans in the 19th century, Spring Branch is named for a spring fed creek that flows into the Guadalupe River.

Geography 
Spring Branch is located in western Comal County along U.S. Highway 281, north of Bulverde, west of Canyon Lake and the surrounding unincorporated community of the same name. The city covers 1.9 square miles.

History 

A significant portion of Spring Branch that borders the Guadalupe River was first settled by German native Adam Becker (1815–1901). Becker journeyed to Texas in 1845 to join Prince Carl of Solms-Braunfels in establishing a colony on behalf of the Adelsverein, also known as the German Emigration Company. Becker contributed to the building of Fredericksburg, Texas, and assisted with other aspects of the colony. He married Elizabeth Monken and by 1852 had established his homestead on what is now Phantom Rider Trail in Spring Branch. On his homestead, he raised cattle. The house he built for his family, which was privately restored in the first decade of the 21st century, was constructed of locally quarried stone and hand-hewn cypress from the banks of the nearby Guadalupe River. Adam Becker became a United States citizen in 1860 and upon his death in 1901 was buried in the cemetery on his homestead.

Incorporation 

The movement to incorporate Spring Branch was initiated over concerns that the area could possibly be annexed into the growing city of Bulverde, which lies to the south. Voters in Bulverde adopted a home rule charter in May 2015 that would allow the city to involuntarily annex bordering properties, including portions of the Spring Branch community. Supporters of the measure also cited local control and preservating the character of the community as further reasons to incorporate. Opponents questioned the economic viability of incorporating a small community with a limited tax base to fund and provide city services. Others expressed the desire to remain unincorporated, but would also prefer having their own city to becoming part of Bulverde.

The petition to place the issue on the ballot was approved by the Comal County Commissioners Court on August 20, 2015. On November 3, 2015, a total of 80 votes were cast, 51 (63.75%) in favor of incorporation and 29 (36.25%) against. Voters also elected a mayor and two commissioners. On November 12, the County Commissioners certified the election results and an official Order of Incorporation was issued by Judge Sherman Krause on November 19.

The elected mayor, James Mayer, and commissioners Brad Hockman and Danny Moore were sworn in on December 11, 2015.

Education 

The Comal Independent School District serves students living in Spring Branch.

Zoned campuses for areas west of U.S. Highway 281 include Arlon Seay Elementary School (grades K–5) and Spring Branch Middle School (grades 6–8), and Smithson Valley High School (grades 9–12).

Zoned campuses for areas east of U.S. Highway 281 include Bill Brown Elementary School (grades K–5), Smithson Valley Middle School (grades 6–8), and Smithson Valley High School (grades 9–12).

Bracken Christian School, a private Pre-K–12, non-denominational campus is also located near Spring Branch.

References 

The middle school for those students who live to the east of 281 is Mountain Valley Middle School. These students will attend Canyon Lake High School.

External links 

City of Spring Branch – Official website
Bulverde/Spring Branch Area Chamber of Commerce

Cities in Comal County, Texas
Populated places established in 1852
Greater San Antonio
Cities in Texas
Populated places on the Guadalupe River (Texas)
1852 establishments in Texas